Echiodon neotes is a fish species described by Markle and Olney, 1990. Echiodon neotes is part of the genus Echiodon and the subfamily Carapinae.

References 

Carapidae